Are You Watching This?! (RUWT?!) is an Austin, Texas-based Sports Excitement Analytics company that uses algorithms to identify sporting events that viewers would find exciting or compelling. It was founded by Mark Phillip, an American MIT Computer Science Major.

Overview
RUWT?! was founded in 2006, launched publicly in 2007, and was bootstrapped by Phillip, its sole employee.

The service uses algorithms to analyze live game data to determine if games are exciting, identifying events like rivalries or upsets.  The opinions of the service's 25,000 "Super Fans" add a subjective influence to the overall excitement rating of each game.  The ratings for each game range from zero to infinity, bucketed into OK, GOOD, HOT, and EPIC ranges.  When a game hits an excitement "crescendo", the website sends email and text alerts to subscribers.  Their sole competitor is Thuuz.

Despite having a consumer-facing website, the company focuses on licensing excitement data via its API to larger companies.  Comcast is one such customer, and the company's data is used by millions of Xfinity X1 subscribers.  The API also includes DVR Extender, Natural Language, and Video Highlight functionality.  Other customers include Bleacher Report, CBS Sports, Telstra Communications, and Turner Sports.

A patent for a Rating system for identifying exciting sporting events and notifying users was filed by RUWT?! in 2007 and was granted on August 23, 2016.  The patent expires on July 17, 2033.  As of July 2017, Are You Watching This?! was in patent licensing discussions with Thuuz.

References

External links

Privately held companies based in Texas
Companies based in Austin, Texas
American sport websites
Internet properties established in 2006
2006 establishments in Texas